Fiander Lake is a lake in the U.S. state of Washington.

Fiander Lake has the name of Richard and Betsy Fiander, pioneer settlers.

References

Lakes of Thurston County, Washington